Feliciana may refer to:

Feliciana, Kentucky, an unincorporated community
Feliciana Parish, Louisiana, a parish from 1810 to 1824, when it was divided into East and West Feliciana Parish

See also
East Feliciana Parish, Louisiana
West Feliciana Parish, Louisiana
Feliciano (disambiguation)